Gourds include the fruits of some flowering plant species in the family Cucurbitaceae, particularly Cucurbita and Lagenaria. The term refers to a number of species and subspecies, many with hard shells, and some without. One of the earliest domesticated types of plants, subspecies of the bottle gourd, Lagenaria siceraria, have been discovered in archaeological sites dating from as early as 13,000 BCE. Gourds have had numerous uses throughout history, including as tools, musical instruments, objects of art, film, and food.

Terminology

Gourd is occasionally used to describe crop plants in the family Cucurbitaceae, like pumpkins, cucumbers, squash, luffa, and melons. More specifically, gourd refers to the fruits of plants in the two Cucurbitaceae genera Lagenaria and Cucurbita, or also to their hollow, dried-out shell.

There are many different gourds worldwide. The main plants referred to as gourds include several species from the genus Cucurbita (mostly native to North America, including the Malabar gourd and turban squash), Crescentia cujete (the tree gourd or calabash tree, native to the American tropics) and Lagenaria siceraria (bottle gourd, thought to be originally from Africa but present worldwide). Other plants with gourd in their name include the luffa gourd (likely domesticated in Asia), which includes several species from the genus Luffa, as well as the wax gourd, snake gourd, teasel gourd, hedgehog gourd, buffalo gourd/coyote gourd. The bitter melon/balsam apple/balsam pear is also sometimes referred to as a gourd.

History
L. siceraria or bottle gourd, are native to the Americas, being found in Peruvian archaeological sites dating from 13,000 to 11,000 BCE and Thailand sites from 11,000 to 6,000 BCE. A study of bottle gourd DNA published in 2005 suggests that there are two distinct subspecies of bottle gourds, domesticated independently in Africa and Asia, the latter approximately 4,000 years earlier. The gourds found in the Americas appear to have come from the Asian subspecies very early in history, although a new study now indicates Africa. The archaeological and DNA records show it is likely that the gourd was among the first domesticated species, in Asia between 12,000 and 13,000 years before present, and possibly the first domesticated plant species.

Wild, poisonous gourds (Citrullus colocynthis) were unknowingly added to the company of prophets' stew according to a story of Elisha in the Hebrew Bible. Elisha added flour to the stew in order to purify it.

Gourds continued to be used throughout history in almost every culture throughout the world. European contact in North America found extensive gourd use, including the use of bottle gourds as birdhouses to attract purple martins, which provided bug control for agriculture. Almost every culture had musical instruments made of gourds, including drums, stringed instruments common to Africa and wind instruments, including the nose flutes of the Pacific.

Research

Scientists in India have been working on crossbreeding six members of the Momordica (bitter gourd) genus found in India to reduce the unpleasant taste while retaining the nutritional and medicinal values of the plants. These include Teasle gourd (Momordica dioica), Spine gourd (Momordica subangulata), Sweet gourd (Momordica cochinchinensis), balsam apple (Momordica balsamina) and Momordica sahyadrica.

Uses
Cultures from arid regions often associated gourds with water, and they appear in many creation myths. Since the beginning of their history, they have had a multitude of uses, including food, kitchen tools, toys, musical instruments and decoration. Today, gourds are commonly used for a wide variety of crafts, including jewelry, furniture, dishes, utensils and a wide variety of decorations using carving, burning and other techniques.

Gourds are also used in instruments. For example, the Balafon, a West-African percussion instrument, is a xylophone that has gourds attached to the bottom of each note for resonance.

See also
 A güiro is a Latin American percussion instrument made from a gourd.
 Maracas are percussion instruments often made from gourds.
 A sitar is a plucked stringed instrument, parts of which are made from gourds.
 African percussion instruments are made incorporating gourds, including the shekere, axatse, balafon, and caxixi.
 Salakot, a traditional headgear of the Philippines which can be made from the bottle gourd

Citations

General bibliography

External links

 

Bottles
Cucurbitaceae

fr:Courge
id:Labu
nl:Kalebas